Wolverhampton West may refer to:

 the western area of the city of Wolverhampton in the West Midlands of England
 Wolverhampton West (UK Parliament constituency) (1885–1950)